Michael Edward Krukow (born January 21, 1952), nicknamed "Kruk", is an American former professional baseball player and sportscaster. As a starting pitcher, he played in Major League Baseball (MLB) for the Chicago Cubs, Philadelphia Phillies, and San Francisco Giants. He has been a television and radio broadcaster for the Giants since 1990, and is one half of the popular "Kruk and Kuip" duo, alongside his friend and former teammate Duane Kuiper. He was an All-Star in 1986.

Early life
Krukow was born in Long Beach, California and attended San Gabriel High School in San Gabriel, California, where he played as a catcher. Growing up in Southern California, Krukow was a fan of the Los Angeles Dodgers, the Giants archrival, and attended many games at Dodger Stadium with his father. He was drafted as a catcher by the California Angels in the 32nd round of the 1970 Major League Baseball Draft, but did not sign.

College career
Krukow became a pitcher and played college baseball for the Cal Poly Mustangs in San Luis Obispo, California. Though his collegiate eligibility was cut short, he still holds the school record for career earned run average at 1.94, and is tied for most shutouts in a season with five.

Professional career

Draft, minor leagues, and Chicago Cubs (1976–1981)
The Chicago Cubs selected Krukow in the eighth round of the 1973 MLB draft.

Philadelphia Phillies (1982)
He was traded from the Cubs to the Phillies for Keith Moreland, Dickie Noles and Dan Larson on December 8, 1981. 

For the Phillies, the right-handed starter was second only to Steve Carlton in wins, posting a 13–11 record and an impressive 3.12 ERA.

San Francisco Giants (1983–1989)
He was dealt along with Mark Davis and minor-league outfielder C.L. Penigar from the Phillies to the Giants for Joe Morgan and Al Holland on December 14, 1982.

Although known as a starter, Krukow earned his only career save on August 31, 1984, pitching to just one batter (the Phillies' Sixto Lezcano), inducing a game-ending groundout, therefore preserving a 6–5 Giant victory.

Krukow's best campaign was in  when he became the first Giants pitcher since Ron Bryant in 1973 to win at least 20 games in a season with a 20–9 record and a 3.05 ERA. Krukow finished third in that year's NL Cy Young Award behind Mike Scott and Fernando Valenzuela. Krukow was selected to the National League All-Star team that season. He received the Willie Mac Award in 1985 and 1986 for his spirit and leadership. In , Krukow helped lead the Giants to their first division championship in 16 years.

Krukow's 17 no decisions were the most among MLB starting pitchers in 1987, as well as being the most ever by a Giants starter dating back to at least 1908. He made the only postseason appearance of his career in Game-4 of the 1987 National League Championship Series. Krukow was the winning pitcher in a nine-inning complete game, allowing two runs on nine hits, as the Giants beat the St. Louis Cardinals, 4–2. It was the Cardinals, however, that took the series in seven games to reach the World Series.

Krukow went 4–3 with a 3.98 ERA during a 1989 campaign which was cut short on June 30 when he underwent arthroscopic surgery to repair a rotator cuff tear in his pitching shoulder after spending parts of three seasons on the injured list for what was believed to be bursitis. He was ninth in Giants franchise history with 66 wins and sixth with 802 strikeouts at the time of his retirement as an active player on March 19, 1990 due to recurring shoulder problems. Krukow posted a 124–117 record with a 3.90 ERA in 369 games during his 14-season MLB career.

Broadcasting career
After his playing career, Krukow became a radio and television sportscaster. He is a seven-time Emmy award winner. "Kruk," who was named as the starting right-handed pitcher to the 1980s Giants All-Decade Team in a vote by Bay Area media in 1999, is noted for his deep knowledge of the game and tremendous sense of humor. He is known for his detailed scouting reports on umpires' strike zones.

Part of the San Francisco Giants broadcasting team, Krukow is half of the duo dubbed "Kruk and Kuip," (pronounced "Kruke" and "Kipe") along with partner Duane Kuiper, a former Giants teammate. Krukow and Kuiper tape a game-day commentary ("Kruk and Kuip on baseball") for KNBR radio as part of the Giants' pre-game radio coverage. Notably, although Krukow was a pitcher and Kuiper was a position player, Krukow has five career home runs, four more than Kuiper (who managed only one in his career despite having over 3,000 at-bats).

Krukow has a few "Kruktionary" catchphrases, including: "Grab some pine, meat"; "Just another, ha ha ha ha, laugher!" (after a nail-biter win); and "I wanna get that!", the last of which is associated with a product endorsement.

Video games
Krukow and Kuiper can be heard as the commentators in Electronic Arts video games MVP Baseball 2003, 2004 and 2005. They include Krukow's familiar "grab some pine, meat" quote.

Personal life 

Until 2014, Krukow and his wife Jennifer resided in San Luis Obispo, California, but they moved to Reno, Nevada to be closer to their grandchildren though Krukow stays in San Francisco during the season. They have five adult children, Jarek, Baker, Tessa, Chase and Weston. Mike Krukow is a talented musician, and proficient in the guitar, the mandolin, the banjo, and the ukulele.

In July 2014, Krukow revealed he was suffering from inclusion body myositis (IBM). His condition was known to the Giants and many of his fellow broadcasters, but he kept the condition a secret from the general public until then. According to sportswriter Steve Fainaru, Krukow "blew it off... for years", but "secretly feared he had amyotrophic lateral sclerosis, Lou Gehrig's disease". Finally, in 2011, he saw the Giants' team neurologist, who referred him to a neuromuscular specialist who in turn diagnosed him with IBM. The disease, which mainly affects the quadriceps and hand muscles, is not life-threatening, but now requires him to use a cane; eventually, Krukow will have to use a walker and/or a scooter. Because of increasing hand weakness that limits his ability to play stringed instruments, he has recently taken up the drums, which require a different set of muscular movements. Krukow plans to continue broadcasting for the foreseeable future, but in 2017, he announced that he would reduce his schedule to 120 games a season working road games only west of Denver, except for postseason games.

For the 2020 season, NBC Sports Bay Area announced that it would experiment with having Krukow comment from the network's San Francisco studio rather than on-site (promoted as "SplitKast") for 22 NL West road games. However, since no broadcasters were allowed to travel to opposing ballparks due to the COVID-19 pandemic, Krukow and Kuiper ended up broadcasting each Giants game from Oracle Park.

References

External links

 The Buddy System: Long-lasting friendship between Krukow, Kuiper comes across the airwaves
 San Francisco Giants Broadcast Team on the Comcast SportNet Bay Area site

National League All-Stars
Cal Poly Mustangs baseball players
Chicago Cubs players
Philadelphia Phillies players
San Francisco Giants announcers
San Francisco Giants players
Major League Baseball pitchers
Major League Baseball broadcasters
Baseball players from Long Beach, California
1952 births
Sportspeople from Long Beach, California
Living people
Gulf Coast Cubs players
Midland Cubs players
Wichita Aeros players
Phoenix Firebirds players